The women's shot put event at the 1985 Summer Universiade was held at the Kobe Universiade Memorial Stadium in Kobe on 29 August 1985.

Results

References

Athletics at the 1985 Summer Universiade
1985